Molybdenum diselenide is an inorganic compound of molybdenum and selenium. Compounds of this category are known as transition metal dichalcogenides, abbreviated TMDCs. These compounds, as the name suggests, are made up of a transition metals and elements of group 16 on the periodic table of the elements.

Structure 

Like many TMDCs,  is a layered material with strong in-plane bonding and weak out-of-plane interactions. These interactions lead to exfoliation into two-dimensional layers of single unit cell thickness.

The most common form of these TMDCs have trilayers of molybdenum sandwiched between selenium ions causing a trigonal prismatic metal bonding coordination, but it is octahedral when the compound is exfoliated. The metal ion in these compounds is surrounded by six  ions. The coordination geometry of the Mo is sometimes found as octahedral and trigonal prismatic.

Synthesis 

Synthesis of  involves direct reaction of molybdenum and selenium in a sealed tube at high temperature. Chemical vapor transport with a halogen (usually bromine or iodine) is used to purify the compound at very low pressure (less than 10-6 torr) and very high temperature (600–700 °C). It has to be heated very gradually to prevent explosion due to its strong exothermic reaction. Stoichiometric layers crystallize in a hexagonal structure as the sample cools. Excess selenium can be removed by sublimation under vacuum.

 Mo  +  2 Se   →

2D- 

The electron mobility  of 2D- is significantly higher than that of 2D-. 2D  adopts structures reminiscent of graphene, although the latter's electron mobility is thousands of times greater still. In contrast to graphene, 2D- has a direct band gap, suggesting applications in transistors and photodetectors.

Natural occurrence 
Molybdenum(IV) selenide occurs in the nature as the extremely rare mineral drysdallite.

References 

Selenides
Molybdenum(IV) compounds
Transition metal dichalcogenides
Monolayers